Malachy Robert Sullivan O.S.B. (August 21, 1893 – July 24, 1967) was an American Roman Catholic priest, collegiate instructor, and football coach.

Coaching career
Sullivan was the first head football coach at St. Benedict's College—now known as Benedictine College—in Atchison, Kansas. He held that position for the 1920 and 1921 seasons.  His coaching record at Benedictine was 8–6.

Death
Sullivan died of a heart attack in 1967.

References

External links
 

1893 births
1967 deaths
Basketball coaches from Nebraska
Benedictine Ravens football coaches
Benedictine Ravens men's basketball coaches
Sportspeople from Lincoln, Nebraska
Catholics from Nebraska
20th-century American Roman Catholic priests